This Broken Heart may refer to several songs:

 "This Broken Heart" (1973), from American funk band Funkadelic's album Cosmic Slop
 "This Broken Heart" (2003), from California rock band Something Corporate's album North
 "This Broken Heart" (2006), from New Zealand rock band Tadpole's album Tadpole